Rugrats: Search for Reptar is a platform video game that was released in North America on Halloween 1998 and in Europe in November 1998 exclusively for PlayStation in North America and in the PAL region by THQ. Based on the popular Nickelodeon cartoon Rugrats, which aired from 1991 until 2004, the game follows the cartoon's main character, Tommy Pickles, who has lost his Reptar puzzle. It features stages that are typically based on episodes from the television show. Its rival game, SpongeBob SquarePants: SuperSponge, has the same genres on the same platform. It was followed up by Rugrats: Studio Tour, released in 1999 on the same platform.

Rugrats: Search for Reptar was developed with the intent of appealing to ages seven through twelve. A  marketing campaign, which was the second-biggest of 1998, was formed in conjunction between Sony Computer Entertainment America and THQ for its North American release, in order to bolster the children's market on the PlayStation.

The game has been met with mixed reviews from critics, though it has regularly been noted that children will enjoy it. It was criticized for its camera and gameplay by publications such as IGN and GameSpot but was given a positive reception for its presentation and was well-received commercially, being the third-best-selling game in the first two weeks of its release. It was incorporated into the Greatest Hits brand and sold nearly 1.5 million copies, becoming one of the best-selling games on the PlayStation.

Gameplay and premise

The game follows the main character of the cartoon Rugrats, Tommy Pickles, who has lost eleven pieces of a twelve-piece jigsaw puzzle featuring the cartoon dinosaur Reptar. It is a 3D platform game which requires players to control several of the main characters in order to accomplish the goals. The game has fourteen levels that are accessed when players pick up certain objects and also has bonus levels with Reptar bars. The levels can be played in any order, but the more difficult levels have to be unlocked to be playable.

The levels that players explore are mostly based on episodes from the cartoon, such as "Chuckie's Glasses", and contain various pieces of the Reptar puzzle. The game also has a training and activities mode, as well as a multiplayer mode. The game makes use of several of the voice actors from the cartoon to reprise their roles, including E. G. Daily, Kath Soucie, Christine Cavanaugh, and Cheryl Chase.

Development and release
In 1997, THQ signed an agreement with Nickelodeon to develop and publish video games using the Rugrats license through December 2002. The deal gave THQ exclusive rights to Rugrats for all current and future game systems from Nintendo, Sony and Sega. Among the first projects announced from this deal was a PlayStation game set to be developed by n-Space and released in 1998.

Rugrats: Search for Reptar was developed with the intent of appealing to children ages seven to twelve. THQ started a multimillion-dollar marketing campaign for Search for Reptar, the second-biggest campaign of 1998, after The Legend of Zelda: Ocarina of Times campaign for the Nintendo 64. Marketing included television and print advertisements, promotional tie-ins, and online advertisements; demos were distributed among kiosks, hardware pack-ins, and on PlayStation: The Official Magazine demo discs; and images of the game were shown on Rugrats Fruit Snacks' boxes. The campaign took about one year to formulate, and was a collaboration between Sony Computer Entertainment America and THQ to expand the younger children's market on the PlayStation. It was one of only two THQ games to have television advertisements at the time, the other being WCW/nWo Thunder.

The game was released in North America on November 23, 1998, and in PAL regions the same month.

Voice cast
 E. G. Daily as Tommy Pickles
 Christine Cavanaugh as Chuckie Finster
 Kath Soucie as Phil DeVille and Lil DeVille
 Cheryl Chase as Angelica Pickles
 Jack Riley as Stu Pickles
 Melanie Chartoff as Didi Pickles
 Joe Alaskey as Grandpa Lou Pickles

Reception

Rugrats: Search for Reptar has received generally mixed to positive reviews. It holds an aggregate score of 68.75% at GameRankings, based on four reviews.

An editor for Electric Playground gave it an 8 out of 10 score, while an editor for Electronic Gaming Monthly gave it a 6.5 out of 10; an editor for the National Academy of Video Game Testers and Reviewers criticized the controls and difficulty, but commented that it was still a great game for children. In his preview, IGN'''s Doug Perry wrote that hardcore gamers looking for an easy game would enjoy its "universal humor" and "silly kiddie havoc", while fans of the series may also enjoy it. He praised the presentation, yet criticized the poor camera control and collision detection; in spite of the recommendation in the preview, he felt that the premise would appeal to fans of the cartoon, but that the game may not. An editor for IGN said that it would be likely to appeal to both young and female gamers, due to its less challenging gameplay and "adorable" characters. GameSpot's Joe Fielder felt that it was a quality title for children, yet criticized it for its camera.Search for Reptar was the third best-selling game in the first two weeks from its release in North America. Search for Reptar was a consistent chart-topper and was described as a "breakout PlayStation hit" by THQ's senior vice president of sales, Alison Locke, who attributed the success of the children's market on the PlayStation to Search for Reptar. On June 7, 2003, it was reported that over 1.5 million copies of the game had been sold.

SequelSearch for Reptar was re-released as a Greatest Hits title, and was followed by a sequel titled Rugrats: Studio Tour''.

References

External links
 

1998 video games
PlayStation (console) games
PlayStation (console)-only games
Rugrats and All Grown Up! video games
THQ games
Klasky Csupo video games
Video games developed in the United States